F/A-18 Hornet 2.0 is a video game developed and published by Graphic Simulations for the Macintosh in 1995.

Gameplay
F/A-18 Hornet 2.0 is a combat flight simulator involving the F/A-18 Hornet.

Reception
In 1996, Next Generation listed F/A-18 Hornet 2.0 as number 67 on their "Top 100 Games of All Time", commenting that, "the detail in the worlds is very high, and the graphics are great."

Reviews
Mac Ledge (1996)

References

1995 video games
Classic Mac OS games
Classic Mac OS-only games
Combat flight simulators
Video games developed in the United States